Microlenecamptus signatus is a species of beetle in the family Cerambycidae. It was described by Per Olof Christopher Aurivillius in 1914, originally under the genus Cylindrepomus. It is known from Laos and Myanmar.

References

Dorcaschematini
Beetles described in 1914